The Ashford Mansion, also known as the Ashford House is a turn of the 20th century residence located in Ashford, Washington.  The house was built in 1903, in the Colonial Revival style by Cora Ashford, for whom the town of Ashford is also named.  The building was constructed of solid grain Douglas Fir, with a porch enclosing three sides of the main floor and a covered veranda on each end of the second floor.  The mansion is located in south Pierce County, seven miles from the Nisqually River Entrance to Mount Rainier National Park.  From the time of its construction until 1967 the mansion stayed in the Ashford family. After its sale the mansion served at different times as a private residence, an English-style bed and breakfast, and is currently rent-able for various functions.

See also
List of Registered Historic Places in Washington
List of Registered Historic Places in Pierce County, Washington

References

External links
National Register of Historic Places: Ashford Mansion entry

History of Washington (state)
Houses in Pierce County, Washington
Houses on the National Register of Historic Places in Washington (state)
National Register of Historic Places in Pierce County, Washington